is a district located in Hyōgo Prefecture, Japan.

As of 2003, the district has an estimated population of 67,363 and a density of 185.93 persons per km2. The total area is 362.31 km2.

Towns and villages
Fukusaki
Ichikawa
Kamikawa

Merger
On November 7, 2005, the towns of Kanzaki and Ōkawachi merged to form the new town of Kamikawa.
On March 27, 2006, the town of Kōdera merged into the city of Himeji.

 (average of three town offices)

Districts in Hyōgo Prefecture